The Boardman House is a historic house located at 120 East Buffalo Street in Ithaca, Tompkins County, New York.

Description and history 
The house was built in 1866 by A.B. Dale for George McChain, on land purchased from Ezra Cornell. It is a three-story, Italianate structure with red brick and brown trim, with full basement. The main block is 42 feet square and features a hipped roof and cupola.

The house is named for Judge Douglass Boardman, the first dean of Cornell Law School, who purchased it in 1886. In 1911, the building was sold to the Ithaca Conservatory of Music, now Ithaca College.

In 1966, the Ithaca College Museum of Art opened in the Boardman House, but the museum closed in 1972. The college sold the building in 1972.

The building was listed on the National Register of Historic Places on May 6, 1971.

See also
 De Witt Park Historic District
 Douglas Boardman

References

External links

Buildings and structures in Ithaca, New York
Houses on the National Register of Historic Places in New York (state)
Italianate architecture in New York (state)
Houses completed in 1867
Houses in Tompkins County, New York
National Register of Historic Places in Tompkins County, New York